Zuo Yiteng (born 4 April 1995 in Beijing) is a Chinese footballer who currently plays for Chinese Super League side Changchun Yatai.

Club career
Zuo Yiteng joined Chinese Super League side Changchun Yatai's youth academy in 2006. He was promoted to first squad in 2016. On 17 April 2016, he made his debut for Changchun Yatai in the 2016 Chinese Super League against Chongqing Lifan.

Career statistics
Statistics accurate as of match played 31 December 2020.

References

External links
 

1995 births
Living people
Chinese footballers
Association football defenders
Footballers from Beijing
Changchun Yatai F.C. players
Chinese Super League players
China League One players